The 2015 Holland Hills Classic (known as the 2015 Boels Rental Hills Classic for sponsorship purposes) was a one-day women's cycle race held between Sittard and Berg en Terblijt in the Netherlands.

Results

See also
 2015 in women's road cycling

References

Holland Hills Classic
Holland Hills Classic
Holland Hills Classic